Superior iliac spine may refer to:

 Anterior superior iliac spine
 Posterior superior iliac spine